Haridimos ("Hari") Tsoukas (born 1961) is a Greek organization and leadership theorist and professor of organization studies.

Tsoukas currently is The Columbia Ship Management Professor of Strategic Management at the University of Cyprus, and Distinguished Research Environment Professor of Organization Studies at the Warwick Business School, University of Warwick. From 2003 to 2008, he served as Editor-in-chief of Organization Studies, a major management journal. He has conducted pioneering research in the fields of knowledge-based perspectives on organizations, the epistemology of practice, epistemological issues in organization theory, and management of organizational change and social reforms.

The Hellenic Society for Systemic Studies honored his work in 2009 with their The Hellenic Society for Systemic Studies Award.

Career 
Tsoukas obtained his BSc in Electrical Engineering (1983) from the Aristotle University of Thessaloniki, his MSc in Industrial Engineering (1985) from Cranfield University, and his PhD in Organizational Sociology (1989) from the Manchester Business School at the University of Manchester.

From 1988 to 1990, Tsoukas taught at Manchester Business School, 1990 to 1995 at Warwick Business School, 1995 to 1998 at the University of Cyprus, 1998 to 2000 at the University of Essex, 2000 to 2003 at the University of Strathclyde, and 1999 to 2009 at the ALBA Graduate Business School.

Besides his work in research and education, Tsoukas contributed to different publications amongst which an assignment as Editor-in-chief (2003–2008) of Organization Studies, the renowned peer-reviewed academic journal. Further, Tsoukas maintains a personal blog in Greek entitled "Enarthre Kravge" (Articulate Howl), on which he regularly comments on Greek and Cypriot politics.

Selected publications
Tsoukas published more than 65 works in 200 publications, held in more than 3400 libraries worldwide.

 (2009) A dialogical approach to the creation of new knowledge in organizations, Organization Science, 2009, 20/6: 941-957
 (2005) Complex Knowledge: Studies in Organizational Epistemology, Oxford University Press
 (2003) The Oxford Handbook of Organization Theory: Meta-theoretical Perspectives (Oxford Handbooks); Oxford University Press

References

External links
 Personal website of Haridimos Tsoukas

1961 births
Living people
Aristotle University of Thessaloniki alumni
Academics of the University of Warwick
The Hellenic Society for Systemic Studies Award
Academic staff of the University of Cyprus
People from Karpenisi